Kearny Mesa is a community in the central part of San Diego, California. It is bounded by State Route 52 to the north, Interstate 805 to the west, Aero Drive to the south, and Interstate 15 to the east. Adjacent communities include Serra Mesa, Clairemont and Tierrasanta.

Kearny Mesa has a population of 2,837.

History

Kearny Mesa is named for the former Camp Kearny, a U.S. military base which operated in the area from 1917 to 1946 and eventually became Marine Corps Air Station Miramar. Camp Kearny in turn was named for Brigadier General Stephen W. Kearny, a leader in the Mexican–American War who also served as a military governor of California. While General Kearny's name was pronounced "Car-nee" during his lifetime, San Diegans use the "Cur-nee" pronunciation.

The urbanization of Kearny Mesa began in 1937 with Gibbs Airfield, now the small airfield Montgomery Field named after pioneer glider pilot John J. Montgomery. However, airspace conflicts with MCAS Miramar (at that time NAS Miramar) made the proposed airport infeasible. Montgomery Field was restricted to small aircraft, and the surplus land was converted to an industrial park.

Beginning in 1955 with General Dynamics, numerous aerospace, electronic, and other industrial and office firms located in the area. There was also commercial development, particularly west of State Route 163.

On October 20, 2020, the Convoy District was designated as the Convoy Pan Asian Cultural & Business Innovation District.

Geography
As implied by the name "mesa", the area is mostly flat. Kearny Mesa is located between the communities of Clairemont to the west, Tierrasanta to the east, Miramar/Mira Mesa to the north, and Linda Vista/Serra Mesa to the south. The area is bordered by the major highways of San Diego. Kearny Mesa is triangular with its base Highway 52 bordering the top side on the north and the two other sides being represented by Interstate 805 to the west and Highway 163 to the east and extending southward.

Montgomery Field is a local municipal airport in Kearny Mesa. The community is adjacent to Marine Corps Air Station Miramar.

There are several residential developments in the community, among them Stonecrest, Kearny Lodge, and Royal Highlands.

Climate
Kearny Mesa has a semi-arid climate (Köppen climate classification: Bsk) with mild winters and warm, almost rainless summers.

Economy

The majority of the Kearny Mesa area is commercial and industrial. Local businesses include auto sales, restaurants (primarily American and Asian), supermarkets (American and Asian), national chain stores, and small businesses. The former General Dynamics site is now a mixed-use development known as Spectrum.

Convoy District (Convoy Pan Asian Cultural & Business Innovation District)
The Convoy District is distinguished by the number of diverse businesses owned and representative of different Asian cultures such as Chinese, Korean, Japanese, Vietnamese, and Thai shopping and eating establishments. Some of these extend to the east/central areas (near Balboa Avenue, along State Route 163), or the Emerald Chinese restaurant on the south end (just before it crosses the I-805 overpass past Aero Drive).

The presence of Asian businesses in the Convoy District area is said to have started with the establishment of a Woo Chee Chong grocery store on Convoy Street in 1979. The Korean market chain Zion opened its first store in the Convoy District, also in 1979. A few years later, in 1986, Nijiya Market (a Japanese market located in the southwestern portion of the Convoy District), opened its very first store; it later expanded to more than ten locations in California and Hawaii. These early establishments served as small anchors, and additional Asian shops and restaurants opened nearby. As the area's reputation for its Asian cuisine and merchandise grew, more widely established Asian chain stores such as 99 Ranch Market, Mitsuwa, and H Mart also began setting up sites in the Convoy District.

On October 20, 2020 Convoy District was designated as the Convoy Pan Asian Cultural & Business Innovation District after local businesses, tenants, storeowners, and non profit organizations pushed for the name change. Their efforts were brought to San Diego City Council Member, Chris Cate, and Assembly member Todd Gloria, whom they worked with to put the name change into effect. 

Many different community based organizations and fundraisers support and push for the promotion of local businesses within the Convoy Pan Asian Cultural & Business Innovation District. Convoy District Partnership, one of these organizations, helped fundraise over $30,000 to help create 6 different highway signs that help in the promotion of this district.

Government
The area is part of City Council District 6 and is represented by Councilman Chris Cate.

The original 1977 Serra Mesa Community Plan included Kearny Mesa. It was replaced by the 1992 Kearny Mesa Community Plan which applies just to Kearny Mesa. The Montgomery Field Master Plan also contains land use policies for areas adjacent to the airport.

Several city and county facilities are located in or adjacent to the area, including the Miramar Landfill.

Community groups
The Kearny Mesa Planning Group advises the city on land use and other issues.

See also
 Asian Pacific Thematic Historic District
 Chinatown, Tijuana

References

External links

 Kearny Mesa Planning Group
Kearny Mesa Neighborhood Link
State of Serra Mesa and Kearny Mesa, 2009, by Councilwoman Donna Frye
Will Convoy Become San Diego’s Asiatown?, article from KPBS-FM

Neighborhoods in San Diego
Asian-American culture in San Diego